Clamp in Wonderland is a series of music videos produced by Clamp, a creative team made up by Satsuki Igarashi, Nanase Ohkawa, Tsubaki Nekoi (formerly Mick Nekoi) and Mokona (formerly Mokona Apapa).

The short films feature characters from the group's entire canon of work. The first spans Clamp's career from their beginnings until the year 1994. The sequel Clamp in Wonderland 2 includes over 100 characters from the Clamp universe.

The videos were released to DVD on October 26, 2007 as Clamp in Wonderland 1&2 1989-2006 (BCBA-3143).

Clamp in Wonderland features characters created between 1989 and 1994 and Clamp in Wonderland 2 features characters created between 1995 and 2006.

Production 

Original concept/Original character design: Clamp　
Planning: Nanase Ohkawa
Producer: Satsuki Igarashi
Production producer: Masaki Sawanobori, Kazuhiko Ikekuchi, Masao Maruyama
Storyboard: Mokona Apapa, Mick Nekoi
Director: Morio Asaka
Character design/Art director: Kumiko Takahashi
Music production: Clamp Co., Ltd.
In collaboration with: Clamp Research Department, Clamp Research Department's Secretarial Office, Shelty Co., Ltd.
Production: Animate/Madhouse Studios

Theme songs 

Opening theme

Lyricist: Nanase Ohkawa
Song: Junko Hirotani

Ending theme
 
Lyricist: Nanase Ohkawa
Song: Junko Hirotani

Clamp in Wonderland 2 
Featured characters created between 1995-2006.

Production 
Original creator: Clamp
Planning: Nanase Ohkawa
Director: Clamp
Producer: Mitsuyuki Masuhara
Opening storyboard: Mokona
Ending storyboard: Tsubaki Nekoi
Character designer/Animation director (Opening): Hiromi Katō
Animation director (Ending): Yoshinori Kanemori
Color setting: Naoko Kodama
Art director: Akemi Konno
Director of photography: Yuki Hama
Editing: Kashiko Kimura
Animation production: MADHOUSE
General producer: PYROTECHNIST

Theme songs 
Opening theme
action! by Maaya Sakamoto
Composer: h-wonder
Lyrics: Maaya Sakamoto

Ending theme
Oh YEAH! by Round Table feat. Nino

Soundtrack 
Clamp in Wonderland 1&2 1989-2006 Theme Song Collection (VTCL-60003) was released on October 24, 2007.

References

External links 
 
 

Madhouse (company)
Crossover anime and manga
Music videos
Works by Clamp (manga artists)